Dissonants is the third album by Australian rock band Hands Like Houses, released on 27 February 2016. It was preceded by the singles "I Am", released on 15 March and "New Romantics", released on 2 October 2015. The album follows the band's second studio album, Unimagine (2013), and debuted at No. 7 on the ARIA Albums chart. It is the first album to not feature keyboardist Jamal Sabet who left the band back in 2014 to pursue other musical endeavours. In the week of 29 March 2016, "Colourblind" debuted on the US Active Rock chart at No. 49. This is the last album the band released on Rise Records before moving to Hopeless Records in 2017.

Background
Hands Like Houses began recording the album in April 2015. The band worked with James Paul Wisner, whom they had previously worked with on their sophomore effort, Unimagine (2013). After about two months, the band said that the album was near completion. During an interview with ppcorn.com, guitarist Alex Pearson gave a tentative October release date for the album.

Despite a few setbacks, including the cancellation of a headline UK tour in November 2015, the band announced on 18 December 2015 that the album would be released on 26 February 2016 and unveiled the album's full track listing and artwork. The band performed two free acoustic performances with signings in Australia upon the album's release.

Reception

The album was met with critical acclaim upon its release. Most critics citing the album's massive choruses, the lyrics, and Trenton Woodley's vocals. Most credited the band's "heavier" sound as part of the album's success.

Writing for Highlight Magazine, Annette Hansen said of the lyrics, "The magic on this record, though, is in the emotional appeal and lush imagery presented in the lyrics. As I kept listening to this album, hearing more and more of the lyrics each time, it was hard not to want to make note of many beautiful lines." She went on to quote songs Colourblind and Stillwater as examples.

Matt Doria of Blunt Magazine praised Woodley's programming and lyrics in particular, writing, "...synths are indefinitely more refined - less obnoxious, but as prevalent as they've ever been. Along with a broadened hot-to-cold singing range, his songwriting has also sharpened tenfold; subject matter is the same as it's always been, but Woodley is no longer appealing exclusively to Newtown hipsters..."

Track listing
All songs written by Hands Like Houses, with additional writers listed

Personnel

Band
 Trenton Woodley – lead vocals, piano, programming, keyboard
 Matt Cooper – lead guitar
 Alexander Pearson – rhythm guitar, backing vocals
 Joel Tyrrell – bass guitar, backing vocals
 Matt Parkitny – drums

Production
 James Paul Wisner - producer, engineer, mixing
 Erik Ron - producer, engineer, mixing
 Mike Green - engineer
 Jason Adams - engineer
 Blake Harnage - engineer
 Andy VanDette - mastering
 Tony Noriega - assisting

Charts

References

2016 albums
Hands Like Houses albums
Rise Records albums
UNFD albums
Albums produced by Erik Ron